Manuel Tomás Thomson Porto  Mariño  (3 November 1839  – 27 February 1880) was a Chilean frigate captain of the Chilean Navy, who fought and died during the War of the Pacific. Thomson was given command of the ironclad vessel Huáscar following its capture by Chile during the Battle of Angamos. Thomson then took the ship to Arica in order to bombard and blockade the city. While at Arica, the Huáscar fought a duel with the Peruvian monitor Manco Cápac which is known as the Naval Battle of Arica. During this action Thomson was killed.

The Chilean submarine Thomson (SS-20) is named after him.

References

1839 births
1880 deaths
Chilean Navy personnel of the War of the Pacific
19th-century Chilean Navy personnel
Chilean hydrographers